Fernando Jerome Lee Bell (January 22, 1913 – August 29, 2000) was a Major League Baseball outfielder who played for two seasons. He played for the Pittsburgh Pirates in 89 career games from 1939 to 1940.

External links

1913 births
2000 deaths
Major League Baseball outfielders
Pittsburgh Pirates players
Baseball players from Oklahoma
People from Ada, Oklahoma
Tyler Governors players
Beckley Black Knights players
Charlotte Hornets (baseball) players
Hollywood Stars players
John C. Fremont High School alumni
Kansas City Blues (baseball) players
Los Angeles Angels (minor league) players
Louisville Colonels (minor league) players
Memphis Chickasaws players
Newark Bears (IL) players
Oakland Oaks (baseball) players
St. Paul Saints (AA) players
Toronto Maple Leafs (International League) players
Zanesville Cubs players